John H. Adams (September 1, 1914 – August 19, 1995) was an American National Champion Thoroughbred racing jockey who was inducted into the National Museum of Racing and Hall of Fame in 1965.

Early life
Born in Carlisle, Arkansas, John Adams was nicknamed the "Iola Mite" for his boyhood home in Iola, Kansas. He got his first ride at a county fair where his father was delivering feed for the horses and other livestock.  His parents didn't want him to become a jockey and refused to sign the necessary papers for an apprenticeship, so Adams misrepresented his age and became a journeyman immediately.

Jockey
John Adams began his professional riding career at Riverside Park Racetrack in Kansas City. He went on to become a leading jockey beginning in the mid-1930s, with 43 percent of his mounts finishing in the top three over a 24-year period ending in 1958, when he retired due to a back injury. During his career, he rode a number of winners for prominent owners such as Maine Chance Farm and Hasty House Farm. On the horses he considered the two best he ever rode, he won the 1939 Santa Anita Handicap with Kayak II and the 1954 Preakness Stakes with Hasty Road. Adams rode six winners at Bay Meadows Racetrack on April 7, 1938.

Trainer
Upon retirement, Adams became a thoroughbred trainer. His first winner was ridden by his son, John R. Adams.  His best known victory as a trainer occurred with J.O. Tobin's 1977 upset over Seattle Slew in the Swaps Stakes at Hollywood Park Racetrack.

Adams was the nation's leading rider in winning mounts in 1937, 1942, and 1943. In 1956 he was honored with the George Woolf Memorial Jockey Award, which is given by the Jockeys' Guild annually to the thoroughbred horse racing jockey in North America who demonstrates high standards of personal and professional conduct, on and off the racetrack.

Riding career
Years Active: 1935-1958
Number of Mounts: 20,159
Number of Winners: 3,270
Number of Place Finishes: 2,704
Number of Show Finishes: 2,635
Purses Earned: $9,743,109
Winning Percentage: 16.2%

References

 The History of Race Riding and the Jockeys' Guild by staff members of Jockeys' Guild (1998) Turner Publishing, Nashville TN 
 

American jockeys
American Champion jockeys
United States Thoroughbred Racing Hall of Fame inductees
People from Lonoke County, Arkansas
1914 births
1995 deaths
People from Iola, Kansas